Essex County is a county located in the northeastern part of the U.S. state of Vermont. As of the 2020 census, the population was 5,920, making it the least-populous county in both Vermont and New England. Its shire town (county seat) is the municipality of Guildhall. The county was created in 1792 and organized in 1800. Bordered by the Connecticut River next to New Hampshire, Essex County is south of the Canadian province of Quebec. It is the county with the lowest household-income in Vermont.

History
Prior to the arrival of colonists of European descent, the area was populated by the Abenakis. They used the Connecticut and Nulhegan rivers as primary means of travel through the area along with many subsidiary rivers and streams. The culture was mostly hunter-gatherer with a combination of agriculture, hunting and fishing. While the rivers provided good fishing the primary food animal was moose.

Vermont was divided into two counties in March 1778. In 1781 the legislature divided the northernmost county, Cumberland, into three counties: Windham and Windsor, in approximately the modern location for those counties. The northern remainder was called Orange County. This latter tract nearly corresponded with the old New York county of Gloucester, organized by that province March 16, 1770, with Newbury as the shire town.

On September 3, 1783, as a result of the signing of the Treaty of Paris, the Revolutionary War ended with Great Britain recognizing the independence of the United States. Vermont's border with Quebec was established at 45 degrees north latitude.

On November 5, 1792, the legislature divided Chittenden and Orange counties into six separate counties, as follows: Chittenden, Orange, Franklin, Caledonia, Essex, and Orleans.  No reason is given for the county being named after the county of Essex in England.

In 1999, a group of investors bought  from Champion International Paper for $7.5 million, covering parts of fourteen towns in the county. The state of Vermont and the Freeman Foundation purchased easements for $8.5 million to guarantee traditional uses of the land for logging and recreation. In 2008, Plum Creek Timber company announced plans to purchase this property.

The last murder trial held at the county courthouse took place in 1923. In 1973, a non-resident murdered another non-resident. In 2008, two residents died by homicide – the first in 85 years – when police said a young woman was shot by her boyfriend and a 59-year-old man shot his mother.

In 2012, a study indicated that county residents, overall, were the least healthy in the state. The rating was based on premature death, low birth weight, smoking, obesity, inactivity, excessive drinking, car crashes, sexually transmitted diseases, graduation rates, poverty, violent crime rates, air pollution, limited access to healthy food, unemployment, and the number of single parent households.

Demographics

2010 census
As of the 2010 United States Census, there were 6,306 people, 2,818 households, and 1,814 families residing in the county.

Of the 2,818 households, 24.2% had children under the age of 18 living with them, 51.0% were married couples living together, 8.7% had a female householder with no husband present, 35.6% were non-families, and 29.3% of all households were made up of individuals. The average household size was 2.23 and the average family size was 2.70. The median age was 47.4 years.

The median income for a household in the county was $37,734 and the median income for a family was $46,263. Males had a median income of $37,021 versus $28,710 for females. The per capita income for the county was $20,040. About 13.0% of families and 16.9% of the population were below the poverty line, including 25.8% of those under age 18 and 10.3% of those age 65 or over.

Geography

In the north central portion of the county the Nulhegan Basin is a circular area roughly 10 miles (16 km) in diameter. While the origin of this basin may be either an asteroid hit or ancient volcano it has not been proven as either one so far. Within the basin is a bog and the Silvio O. Conte Fish and Wildlife Refuge  with a visitor center, hiking trails, and viewing platforms where one can wait under shelter.

The county has many mountains and waterways. The Northern Forest Canoe Trail passes through this area along the Clyde, Nulhegan, and Connecticut rivers.

Adjacent counties
 Coös County, New Hampshire – east
 Grafton County, New Hampshire – south
 Caledonia County – southwest
 Orleans County – west
 Coaticook Regional County Municipality, Quebec – north

Major roads

Fauna
In 2011, there were about 1,000 moose in the county. State officials estimated that this was about the "correct number" for a sustainable herd, with the moose not showing signs of starvation, nor the feeding grounds showing signs of overgrazing. In recent years the moose population has been suffering from infestations by ticks. Some moose have been found having as many as 10,000 ticks on one moose, thus causing death from both blood loss and Lyme's Disease in the case of deer tick infections. Warmer winter weather in recent years has prevented the normal die-off of ticks from freezing.

National protected area
 Silvio O. Conte National Fish and Wildlife Refuge (part)

Government
The Essex Senate district includes all of Essex County, as well as parts of Orleans County and Caledonia County. It is represented in the Vermont Senate by Russ Ingalls, a Republican.

The elected officials of the county as of the 2018 elections are as follows:

Elections
In 1828, Essex County voted for National Republican Party candidate John Quincy Adams.

Andrew Jackson would win the county in 1832 while Martin Van Buren would win it in 1836, making them the first Democrats to carry the county.

From William Henry Harrison in 1840 to Winfield Scott in 1852, the county would vote the Whig Party candidates.

From John C. Frémont in 1856 to Alf Landon in 1936, the Republican Party would have an 80-year winning streak in the county.

In 1940 and 1944, Essex County would be won by Franklin D. Roosevelt.

Thomas E. Dewey would win the county in 1948 while Dwight D. Eisenhower and Richard Nixon would win it in 1952, 1956 and 1960, respectively.

In 1964, the county was won by incumbent President Lyndon B. Johnson.

Following the Democrats' victory in 1964, the county went back to voting for Republican candidates for another 20-year winning streak starting with Richard Nixon in 1968 and ending with George H. W. Bush in 1988.

From 1980 to 2016, Essex County was a bellwether county, consistently backing the national winner.

In 1992 and 1996, the county was won by Bill Clinton while in 2000, it was one of the four counties in Vermont to be won by George W. Bush.

In 2004, Essex County was the only county in Vermont to vote for George W. Bush, by 10.7% over John Kerry, who won statewide by a 20.1% advantage.

In 2008, Essex voted for Barack Obama by a 14.5% margin over John McCain, while Obama carried the state by 37%. In 2012, Obama won the county again by a similar margin.

In 2016, it was the only county in Vermont that voted for Donald Trump, by nearly 18% over Hillary Clinton, who won the state by 28.5%.

In 2020, it was similarly the only county in Vermont to vote for Donald Trump, the first time it backed a losing presidential candidate since 1976, when it backed Gerald Ford over Jimmy Carter.

|}

Economy

Personal income
The median income for a household in the county was $30,490, and the median income for a family was $34,984. Males had a median income of $27,929 versus $20,583 for females. The per capita income for the county was $14,388. About 9.90% of families and 13.70% of the population were below the poverty line, including 17.30% of those under age 18 and 12.90% of those age 65 or over.

The median wage is the lowest in the state, and that status is expected to continue through 2010.

Housing
In 2007, Essex was the only county in the state to have a positive Housing Affordability Index on housing; i.e. the average household can afford to buy the average house. Both figures are the lowest in the state.

Media
WVTI 106.9 broadcasts from Island Pond, Vermont.

Communities

Towns

 Bloomfield
 Brighton
 Brunswick
 Canaan
 Concord
 East Haven
 Granby
 Guildhall (shire town)
 Lemington
 Lunenburg
 Maidstone
 Norton
 Victory

Census-designated places
 Beecher Falls
 Canaan
 Concord
 Gilman
 Island Pond
 Lunenburg

Unincorporated communities
 North Concord

In Vermont, gores and grants are unincorporated portions of a county which are not part on any town and have limited self-government (if any, as many are uninhabited).
 Avery's Gore
 Warner's Grant
 Warren Gore

In addition, three formally chartered towns have never had sufficient population to organize. Those which are inhabited also have limited self-government.
 Averill
 Ferdinand
 Lewis

See also
 National Register of Historic Places listings in Essex County, Vermont

References

External links
 National Register of Historic Places listing for Essex Co., Vermont
 Philip, Abenaki Indian Chief, and Philip’s Grant (Orleans and Essex Counties)

 
Northeast Kingdom, Vermont
Berlin, New Hampshire micropolitan area
1800 establishments in Vermont
Populated places established in 1800